Possessed is an American death metal band, originally formed in 1983. Noted for their fast style of playing and Jeff Becerra's growled vocals, they are often called the first band in the death metal genre, and paved the way for the 1980s Bay Area thrash metal scene, along with Metallica, Exodus, Testament and Death Angel. The band is also notable for featuring future Primus member Larry LaLonde, who was the lead guitarist for Possessed from 1984 to 1987.

After breaking up in 1987, and reforming from 1990 to 1993, the band reformed again under original bassist and vocalist Jeff Becerra in 2007. Since its inception, Possessed has released three studio albums − Seven Churches (1985), Beyond the Gates (1986) and Revelations of Oblivion (2019) − as well as one live album, two compilation albums and two EPs.

History

Formation (1983)
The band originated in the San Francisco Bay Area in 1983, when San Pablo and El Sobrante residents Mike Torrao (rhythm guitar) and Mike Sus (drums) started a garage band with vocalist Barry Fisk and former Exodus bassist Jeff Andrews under the name Possessed. While the quartet had begun writing some music together, the line-up would be cut short when Fisk committed suicide by gunshot in front of his girlfriend's house in Tara Hills, California, and Andrews subsequently opted not to participate in the group any longer.

Meanwhile, bassist / vocalist Jeff Becerra had recently split with his band Blizzard in the neighboring city of Pinole. That band included Larry LaLonde and Danny Boland on guitars and Michael Miner on drums, all of whom were high school students in the same graduating class. After being approached by Torrao and Sus, Becerra joined Possessed filling both the vacant vocal and bassist positions. The band had also placed an ad for a new guitarist which was answered by Brian Montana, and the second incarnation of Possessed was formed.

Initial career (1983–1987)
Possessed spent 19831984 practicing and working on their sound by performing at local venues and becoming an active part of the Bay Area thrash scene. They recorded the 3-song demo Death Metal in 1984. After live shows with Metallica and Exodus, the latter group brought the band's demo recording to the attention of Brian Slagel, head of Metal Blade Records. Slagel showed interest in the band and offered to put their song "Swing of the Axe" on the upcoming compilation Metal Massacre VI. Following the release of the compilation, guitarist Brian Montana left the band due to creative differences and was replaced by Blizzard guitarist Larry Lalonde. The band then hired Mechanics Bank heiress Debbie Abono (nee Downer), mother of LaLonde's then-girlfriend, Julie, to manage the band.

The compilation drew the attention of Combat Records who signed the band and released their debut album Seven Churches in 1985, with Roadrunner Records handling European distribution. 
In November of the same year, the band flew to Montreal, Quebec, Canada for the WWIII Weekend Festival in support of the Seven Churches release, playing alongside Celtic Frost, Destruction, Voivod and Nasty Savage. The concert was Possessed's first and largest arena appearance, with nearly 7,000 in attendance. Possessed followed the release with a supporting tour which included a performance with Slayer and Venom at San Francisco's Kabuki in 1986.

On Halloween 1986, Possessed released their second album Beyond the Gates. They embarked on a short European tour with Voivod and in the U.S. opening for Dark Angel. In May 1987, the band issued a five-song EP produced by guitarist Joe Satriani titled The Eyes of Horror which marked a change in musical direction for the band. The Satanic themes they had become noted for were almost completely absent, and the songs had more of a thrash metal style than their earlier death metal sound. The song "Storm in My Mind" was written by Lalonde and the rest by Torrao, who had written most of the band's earlier material. Soon after the release, internal tensions among the band members led to their break up.

In 1989, Jeff Becerra was held up at gunpoint by two assailants and was shot twice, leaving him paralyzed from the chest down.

Reformations (1990–present)
Mike Torrao formed an all new version of Possessed in 1990, taking over lead vocals himself, and recorded a two-song demo in 1991. Several different line-ups were attempted, and a four-song demo was recorded in 1993, but the group failed to gain momentum and disbanded shortly after.

In 2007, it was announced Jeff Becerra would be performing under the "Possessed" name at the Wacken Open Air festival and would be backed by the members of Sadistic Intent, one of the bands featured on the Possessed tribute album Seven Gates of Horror released in 2004. They would also headline the Gathering of the Bestial Legions III festival in Los Angeles.  This same lineup also performed at Maryland Deathfest VIII in May 2010. After a U.S. tour with Danzig and Marduk, Rick and Bay Cortez along with Ernesto Bueno returned to Sadistic Intent, while drummer Emilio Marquez remained.

By late 2012, Possessed had begun writing new material for their first full-length studio album since 1986's Beyond the Gates. They had performed several new songs live which were expected to appear on the new album.

In 2017 the band signed a three album recording contract with Nuclear Blast Records. By this time, the band consisted of Becerra and Marquez along with lead guitarist Daniel Gonzalez, bassist Robert Cardenas and rhythm guitarist Claudeous Creamer. Initially set for release in 2018, the band's third studio album Revelations of Oblivion was released on May 10, 2019, their first in 33 years. The album entered the UK Rock & Metal Singles and Albums Charts at #7 in its first week.

In a February 2021 interview, vocalist Becerra stated that he will begin writing new material for the next Possessed album after the band finishes touring in support of Revelations of Oblivion.

Influences
At least four Possessed members who had written and recorded with the band at some point (vocalist/bassist Becerra and former guitarists Torrao, Montana and LaLonde) cite early Exodus and Venom as their main influences, in addition to NWOBHM acts like Motörhead, Iron Maiden and Judas Priest, and other bands such as Rush, Scorpions and Van Halen. Although AllMusic attributed Slayer as being a musical influence for Seven Churches, the first Slayer album Show No Mercy had not been released until December 1983, shortly after members of Possessed were already writing material for their demo and debut album. Lyrically, most of Possessed's songs focused on Satanism and death.

Legacy

Possessed are often cited as the first death metal band, largely because of the early use of grunted vocals, ultra-fast drumming and guitar tremolo picking as previously noted. In the 2004 book, Choosing Death: The Improbable History of Death Metal and Grindcore, Jeff Becerra staked claim to creating the "death metal" nomenclature in 1983. The band's efforts on Seven Churches have been called an influence by groups like Death, Pestilence, Sepultura, Deicide, Morbid Angel, Sadistic Intent, Cannibal Corpse, Gorguts, Sinister, Vader, God Dethroned and Amon Amarth, the latter five bands having appeared on a 2004 Possessed tribute album. Possessed's "The Exorcist" had been covered earlier by Cannibal Corpse on the 1993 Hammer Smashed Face EP.

Even while the band had played only a handful of gigs in the Bay Area, they earned a huge capital of popularity in Europe's metal scene. Members of Napalm Death were influenced by Possessed and credit the band for their musical shift from grindcore to a more death metal direction after Scum. In addition to their impression on overseas death metal, the group would also inspire black metal acts like Germany's Falkenbach, Greece's Rotting Christ, Switzerland's Samael and Norway's Dimmu Borgir.

Chuck Schuldiner, who had relocated his band Death to the Bay Area to write Scream Bloody Gore with Chris Reifert, in tandem with Possessed's rise, told magazine Metal Maniacs:

In the book Choosing Death, Mantas/Death drummer Kam Lee called Possessed the first death metal band, and added:

Author Daniel Ekeroth expanded on Lee's assessment of the 1984 Death Metal demo in his book, Swedish Death Metal:

Possessed's association with Debbie Abono would be a "first" for both sides: Abono would be the band's first manager, and Possessed were Abono's first managed signed band. A grandmother in her mid-fifties at that time, Abono had no previous connection to heavy metal music other than as a concert designated driver for her daughters, one of whom was a girlfriend of guitarist Larry LaLonde. Due to generation gap, Abono also had limited awareness of the sometimes blasphemous themes of heavy metal, and was allegedly offended upon reading the lyric sheet of Seven Churches. Nevertheless, she agreed to manage and represent Possessed as long as Becerra and LaLonde finished high school commitments. Although the group's relationship amongst themselves and their first manager would reach points of discord and eventual termination, Abono would go on to manage additional bands in the Bay Area thrash metal scene like Exodus, Vio-lence and Forbidden Evil, as well as death metal bands like Chicago's Broken Hope and Florida's Cynic and Obituary.

While Possessed's first album, Seven Churches, was praised for its speed and the brutality of the vocals, the second album, Beyond the Gates, disappointed both fans and critics alike. Released on Halloween of 1986, the album was not as powerful and as influential as its predecessor, and the band's popularity suffered because of it.

Original line-up today
Vocalist and former bassist Jeff Becerra continues to play a role in the death, black, and thrash metal scenes. He received a degree in labor studies and plans to attend law school. He revamped the band in 2007.

In 1993, former drummer Mike Sus retired from music to pursue other careers, going on to get a degree in psychology and is helping injured people to live a normal everyday life. He is also a drug addiction counselor.

Former lead guitarist Larry LaLonde joined the Bay Area thrash metal band Blind Illusion which released The Sane Asylum in 1988, after which Lalonde with Blind Illusion bassist Les Claypool went on to form the influential funk metal band Primus in 1989.

In 1995, former rhythm guitarist Mike Torrao joined a new death metal band, Infanticide, but never released any songs to the public. Infanticide broke up in 1997.  He has since worked as a landscaper and plays music only in his spare time. As of 2008, Torrao is working with the band INaCAGE in the San Francisco Bay Area.

Discography

Studio albums

Live albums

Compilation albums

Extended plays

Music videos

Documentaries

Members

Current
Jeff Becerra – vocals , bass 
Emilio Márquez – drums 
Daniel Gonzalez – lead guitar 
Robert Cardenas – bass 
Claudeous Creamer – rhythm guitar 

Former

Barry Fisk – vocals 
Jeff Andrews – bass 
Brian Montana – lead guitar 
Mike Sus – drums 
Mike Torrao – rhythm guitar , vocals 
Larry LaLonde – lead guitar 
Duane Connley – lead guitar 
Dave Alex Couch – lead guitar 
Colin Carmichael – drums 
Chris Stolle – drums 
Bob Yost – bass 
Mark Strausburg – lead guitar 
Walter Ryan – drums 
Mike Hollman – lead guitar 
Paul Perry – bass 
Ernesto Bueno – lead guitar 
Rick Cortez – rhythm guitar 
Bay Cortez – bass 
Tony Campos  – bass 
Kelly Mclauchlin  – rhythm guitar 
Mike Pardi – rhythm guitar 

Timeline

References

External links

 Official website
 Remembering 25 Years Ago Today: WORLD WAR III Festival
 

1983 establishments in California
Black metal musical groups from California
Combat Records artists
Death metal musical groups from California
Musical groups disestablished in 1987
Musical groups disestablished in 1993
Musical groups established in 1983
Musical groups from the San Francisco Bay Area
Musical groups reestablished in 1990
Musical groups reestablished in 2007
Musical quintets
Nuclear Blast artists
Roadrunner Records artists
Thrash metal musical groups from California